Michael Konyves is a Canadian film and television screenwriter. He is best known for his screenplay for the comedy-drama film Barney's Version (2010), which earned him a Genie Award for Best Adapted Screenplay nomination. His notable credits include the television films Descent (2005), Solar Attack (2006), Fire and Ice: The Dragon Chronicles (2008), and the television series Bad Blood (2017).

Awards and nominations

References

External links

Canadian male screenwriters
Canadian television writers
Writers from Montreal
Living people
Year of birth missing (living people)
21st-century Canadian screenwriters
21st-century Canadian male writers
Canadian Screen Award winners